This is a list of known snakes in Missouri, United States.

Non-venomous snakes 

Western Worm Snake
Carphophis vermis

Northern Scarlet Snake
Cemophora coccinea copei

Eastern Yellowbelly Racer
Coluber constrictor flaviventris

Prairie Ring-necked Snake
Diadophis punctatus arnyi

Great Plains Rat Snake
Elaphe guttata

Black Rat Snake
Elaphe obsoleta

Western Fox Snake
Elaphe vulpina

Western Mud Snake
Farancia abacura reinwardtii

Plains Hog-nosed Snake
Heterodon nasicus nasicus

Eastern Hog-nosed Snake
Heterodon platirhinos

Prairie Kingsnake
Lampropeltis calligaster calligaster

Speckled Kingsnake
Lampropeltis getula holbrooki

Red Milk Snake
Lampropeltis triangulum syspila

Eastern Coachwhip
Masticophis flagellum flagellum

Mississippi Green Water Snake
Nerodia cyclopion

Yellow-bellied Water Snake
Nerodia erythrogaster flavigaster

Broad-banded Water Snake
Nerodia fasciata confluens

Diamond-backed Water Snake
Nerodia rhombifer rhombifer

Northern Water Snake
Nerodia sipedon sipedon

Rough Green Snake
Opheodrys aestivus aestivus

Smooth Green Snake
Opheodrys (Liochlorophis) vernalis

Bullsnake
Pituophis catenifer sayi

Graham's Crayfish Snake 
Regina grahamii

Ground Snake 
Sonora semiannulata

Midland Brown Snake
Storeria dekayi wrightorum

Northern Red-bellied Snake
Storeria occipitomaculata occipitomaculata

Flat-headed Snake 
Tantilla gracilus

Western Ribbon Snake
Thamnophis proximus proximus

Plains Garter Snake
Thamnophis radix

Eastern Garter Snake
Thamnophis sirtalis sirtalis

Lined Snake
Tropidoclonian lineatum

Rough Earth Snake
Virginia striatula

Western Earth Snake
Virginia valeriae elegans

Venomous snakes 

Eastern Copperhead
Agkistrodon contortrix

Northern Cottonmouth
Agkistrodon piscivorus

Timber Rattlesnake Crotalus horridus

Western Pygmy Rattlesnake
Sistrurus miliarius streckeri

Eastern Massasauga Rattlesnake
Sistrurus catenatus catenatus

Snakes
Missouri